The Norwegian Forest cat ( and ) is a breed of domestic cat originating in Northern Europe. This natural breed is adapted to a very cold climate, with a top coat of long, glossy, water-shedding  hair and a woolly undercoat for insulation. The breed's ancestors may have been a landrace of short-haired cats brought to Norway about A.D. 1000 by the Vikings, who may also have brought with them long-haired cats, like those ancestral to the modern Siberian and Turkish Angora. During World War II, the Norwegian Forest cat was nearly extinct; then the Norwegian Forest Cat Club's breeding program increased the cat's number. It was registered as a breed with the European Fédération Internationale Féline in the 1970s, when a cat fancier, Carl-Fredrik Nordane, took notice of the breed and made efforts to register it. The breed is very popular in Norway, Denmark, Sweden, Iceland, and France.

It is a big, strong cat, similar to the Siberian and Maine Coon cat breeds, with long legs, a bushy tail, and a sturdy body. It is very good at climbing, partly because of strong claws. The lifespan is usually 14 to 16 years. Kidney and heart diseases have been reported in the breed. Specifically in this breed, complex rearrangements of glycogen branching enzyme (GBE1) can cause a perinatal hypoglycaemic collapse and a late-juvenile-onset neuromuscular degeneration in glycogen storage disease type IV.

History 
The Norwegian Forest cat is adapted to survive Norway's cold weather. Its ancestors may include cold-adapted black and white British Shorthair cats brought to Norway from Great Britain some time after 1000 AD by the Vikings, and longhaired cats brought to Norway by Crusaders around the 14th century. These cats could have reproduced with farm and feral stock and may have eventually evolved into the modern-day Norwegian Forest breed. The Siberian and the Turkish Angora, longhaired cats from Russia and Turkey, respectively, are also possible ancestors of the breed. Since the Norwegian Forest cat is a very adept climber, author Claire Bessant believes that the  folktale could be about the ancestor of the modern Norwegian Forest breed. The name Norse  is used by some breeders and fancier organisations for the modern breed.

Most likely the ancestors of the Norwegian Forest cat served as ships' cats (mousers) on Viking ships. The original landrace lived in the Norwegian forests for many centuries, but were later prized for their hunting skills and were used on Norwegian farms, until they were discovered in the early 20th century by cat enthusiasts.

In 1938 the first organisation devoted to the breed, the Norwegian Forest Cat Club, was formed in Oslo, Norway. The club's movement to preserve the breed was interrupted by World War II. Owing to cross-breeding with free-ranging domestic cats during the war, the Norwegian Forest cat became endangered and nearly extinct until the Norwegian Forest Cat Club helped the breed make a comeback by developing an official breeding program. In the 1950s, King Olav V declared them the official cat of Norway. Since the cat did not leave Norway until the 1970s, it was not registered as a breed in the Fédération Internationale Féline (FIFe), the pan-European federation of cat registries, until Carl-Fredrik Nordane, a Norwegian cat fancier, took notice of the breed, and made efforts to register it. The breed was registered in Europe by the 1970s, and in the American Cat Fanciers Association in 1994. In 1978, it was recognized in Sweden as an official breed, and in 1989, they were accepted as a breed in the United Kingdom by the Norwegian Cat Club of Britain.

The Norwegian Forest breed is very popular in Norway and Sweden. Since 2003, it has been the fifth most popular cat breed in France, where there are about 400 to 500 births per year.

Description 

The Norwegian Forest cat is strongly built and larger than an average cat. Adult females weigh ; males, . The breed has a long, sturdy body; long legs; and a bushy tail. The coat consists of a long, thick, glossy, water-repellent top layer and a woolly undercoat and is thickest at the legs, chest, and head. The undercoat appears as a ruff. The profile of the breed is generally straight. Their water-resistant coat with a dense undercoat developed to help the cat survive in the harsh Scandinavian climate.

The head is long with an overall shape similar to an equilateral triangle, a strong chin, and a muzzle of medium length; a square or round-shaped head is considered to be a defect. The eyes are almond shaped and oblique, and may be of any colour. The ears are large, wide at the base, and high set, have a tufted top, are placed in the extension of the triangle formed by the head, and end with a tuft of hair like the ears of the lynx. 

All coat colors and divisions in the traditional, sepia and mink categories are accepted. Since the cats have very strong claws, they are very good climbers, and can even climb rocks.

Norwegian Forest cats that live primarily outdoors become swift and effective hunters, but the breed can also adapt to indoor life. The cats usually live to be 14 to 16 years old. As they are heavy-boned and tall, they eat more food than most other domestic breeds.

Personality 

They are friendly, intelligent, and generally good with people. The Norwegian Forest cat has a lot of energy. They are very interactive cats who enjoy being part of their family environment and love to play games. Fanciers note that these cats produce a variety of high-pitched "chirping" vocalizations.

Health problems 
Kidney and heart diseases have been reported in the breed. In an experiment directed by John C. Fyfea, Rebeccah L. Kurzhals, and others, it was concluded that a complex rearrangement in the breed's Glycogen branching enzyme (GBE1) can cause both a perinatal hypoglycemic collapse and a late-juvenile-onset neuromuscular degeneration in glycogen storage disease type IV in the breed. This disorder, while rare, can prove fatal to cats that have it. There are DNA tests available for GSD IV, and it is highly recommended (some cat associations obligate their Norwegian Forest cat breeder members) to carry out the DNA test before using such animals for breeding. PawPeds provide a pedigree database which comes together with health programmes, through publishing each single cat's test result, to provide useful information for breeders to make a well-informed breeding decision. The breed has also been known to suffer from hip dysplasia, which is a rare, partially hereditary disease of the hip joint.

Patella luxation is found more in the British Shorthair, Abyssinian and Devon Rex breeds, but it is recognized in Norwegian Forest cats as well. It is a condition in which patella moves out of its original physiological position.

A pedigree with 871 Norwegian Forest cats shows familial cardiomyopathy in this breed. There is also high prevalence of eosinophilic granuloma complex in Norwegian Forest cats which is suggestive of a genetic background.

The main factors causing Toxoplasma gondii seropositivity on cats are age, raw meat and outdoor access. A study shows that T. gondii seropositivity varies by cat breeds. Norwegian Forest cats have a relatively high rate of Toxoplasma gondii seropositivity (4.66%) comparing with other pure-bred cats (Birman: 4.16%, British Shorthair: 3.39%, Korat: 2.03%, Ocicat: 4.26%, Siamese: 2.57%), but slightly lower than Persian cats (6.99%).

Glycogen storage disease type IV due to branching enzyme deficiency was found in an inbred family of Norwegian forest cats.

See also 
 Maine Coon
 Siberian cat
 Norwegian Elkhound
 Norwegian Lundehund
 Norwegian sheep landrace
 Norwegian chicken landrace

References

External links 

 Cat Fanciers' Association Breed Profile: Norwegian Forest Cat
 PawPeds Norwegian Forest cat pedigree database
Standard description of Norwegian Forest cat with images and drawings - Bolboreta Forest Cattery
Video of Norwegian Forest Cat History - Elvenstar Cattery

Breed societies and clubs
 Norsk Skogkatt Society, UK
 Norwegian Forest Cat Club, UK
 Viking Cat Club, UK

Cat breeds originating in Norway
Linebred animals
Natural cat breeds